is a Japanese actress, model, presenter, and singer. She debuted as a singer on April 8, 2015, with the song "Maegami Kirisugita," which was produced by Japanese musician Yasutaka Nakata.

Background 
Mito started working as a model in 2010 and was able to make her 2013 modeling debut in Japanese magazines like Mer, Zip, and Non-no. She later released self-produced photoshoot book "Natsume-san" in 2013, selling 50,000 copies. In January 2015, her management Asobisystem got her a recording contract under Sony Music Associated Records, a sublabel of Sony Music Japan. It was later announced that her music will be produced by Japanese electronica duo Capsule member Yasutaka Nakata. In February 2015, it was announced that Mito will be releasing her debut single, "Maegami Kirisugita", on April 8, 2015. In conjunction with the release, she had contributed the theme song to the Japanese romantic movie "Koisuru Vampire" titled "Colony". The song was included as a B-side to the said single.

In September 2015, Mito released her second single, "8-bit Boy", which was used as the main theme to the Japanese premiere of the American movie Pixels. Its B-side track, "Watashi wo Fes ni Tsuretette", was released as a separate digital single and has received a music video. On April 6, 2016, Mito's third single, "I'll do my best", was released. In May 2016, a song titled "Odekake Summer" was released in a form of music video to promote a Japanese mosquito repellent brand.

In December 2016, it was announced that Mito will be contributing a song for an anime for the first time. The song was revealed to be "Puzzle", which became the ending theme to the animation series Puzzle & Dragons X. The song was officially released as a double A-side single, "Puzzle/Hanabira", on February 22, 2017. The latter was used as a tie-up commercial song to Oyatsu Company's Ramen Noodle Snack product. Few days after the release of the single, Mito's agency, Asobisystem and record label Sony Music Japan, has announced that she will finally be releasing her debut studio album on April 26. The cover and tracklist were revealed later that month. The album debuted at the 64th spot of the Oricon Weekly Albums, selling 1,261 copies on its first week of release.

Discography

Albums 
Natsumelo (2017)

Singles

DVDs

Filmography

Movies
 2015: Koisuru Vampire as Natsu
 2019: Kakegurui – Compulsive Gambler as Runa Yomozuki
 2021: Kakegurui – Compulsive Gambler Part 2 as Runa Yomozuki
 2021: Shinonome-iro no Shūmatsu as Masami Andō
 2022: Love Life
 2023: Kono Chiisana Te

Dramas
 2016: Times "Arau" and "Shimizu" as Mino
 2016: Seisei Suru Hodo, Aishiteru as cake store's clerk 
 2018–2019: Kakegurui as Yomozuki Runa
 2019: Setsuyaku Locke as Natsume Mito

Dubbing
 Paddington as Judy Brown (Japanese version)
 Paddington 2 as Judy Brown (Japanese version)

TV Shows
 2015–2018: MBS Song Town 2016–2018: Mito Natsume's Songstreet 2016–2019: Chi-chin Puipui Getsuyoubi 2017: Kyōnoryōri Beginners Batsue no Sparta Natsu Men Juku 2017: Himitsu no Kenmin SHOW 2018–present: + music 2019–present: Mint! 2019–present: Go go Nama Oishī Kin'yōbiTheatre
 2018: Eg Woman as member of Team Mehyō
 2018: TOP's & BOTTOM's ~ Futatsu no Kokoro to Hitotsu no Mirai ~ as performer
 2018: Tekkonkinkreet as Shiro

 Concert tours 
 Natsumelo Live Tour "Mito Natsume wa Chou-Omedetai"'' (2017)

Bibliography

Nonfiction book

Photo-book

Picture book

References

External links 
 Official Website (Japanese)
 

1990 births
Living people
Japanese women rock singers
Models from Nara Prefecture
Yasutaka Nakata
Musicians from Nara Prefecture
Japanese television presenters
Japanese women television presenters